Stefano "Pino" Sacripanti (born 15 May 1970 in Cantù, Italy) is an Italian professional basketball coach.

Coaching career

He is the coach of the Italian men's national under-20 basketball team since 2006, and led them to the bronze medal at the 2007 FIBA Europe Under-20 Championship, the silver medal at the 2011 FIBA Europe Under-20 Championship and the gold medal at the 2013 FIBA Europe Under-20 Championship.

His first time as a head coach was with Pallacanestro Cantù in 2000.

Since 2015 is the coach of the Italian basketball team Sidigas Avellino.

On 1 June 2018 Sacripanti left Sidigas Avellino after three years.

On 12 June 2018 Sacripanti became new head coach of Segafredo Virtus Bologna.

References

External links 
 Sacripanti page on the official Serie A website

1970 births
Living people
Italian basketball coaches
Pallacanestro Cantù coaches
Juvecaserta Basket coaches
Virtus Bologna coaches
Victoria Libertas Pesaro coaches